Shock cooling refers to the theory that damage to engines (particularly air-cooled aviation piston engines) may occur because of an excessively rapid decrease in temperature.

The situation where rapid cooling arises is on descent from altitude. In this condition, less power is demanded of the engine (it is throttled back) so it is developing much less heat. In a descent, the plane's airspeed increases, simultaneously increasing the cooling rate of the engine. As metals expand and contract under temperature changes, dimensional changes in the engine may exceed tolerance limits.

Manifestation
Damage from shock cooling is most commonly believed to manifest itself as stuck valves, cracked pistons and cracked cylinders.

Analysis
While the subject is very controversial, some believe shock cooling, as commonly explained, is nothing but a myth. This position is supported by the fact twin engine planes commonly experience ideal conditions for shock cooling during simulated, single engine failures, yet statistically show no difference in wear or damage probability distribution between engines. Equally, it has been pointed out the rate cylinder head temperatures drop off after a normal engine shutdown is often much faster than the usual rates deemed to present a shock cooling risk. Furthermore, others believe damage usually associated with shock cooling is actually caused by rapid throttle changes where fuel, which has been supercooled during high-altitude flight, is introduced into a very hot engine cylinder during descent, where rich of peak (as opposed to lean of peak) operation is considered the norm, thus causing higher operating temperatures. It is well established, high operating temperatures in of themselves, can contribute to excessive component wear and damage, which is typically associated with "shock cooling". Given the available data, it strongly suggests "shock cooling" is nothing but a myth, at least in the context as commonly explained.

Detection and prevention

A single cylinder head temperature (CHT) sensor, or in more sophisticated installations, an array of sensors, one for each cylinder, may be employed to monitor the temperature and cooling rate of the engine. Usually a simple analog gauge or a more advanced graphical bar-graph display(see external links below for an image) is used to present information to pilots. Spoilers on the wings or thrust reversal may also be deployed to lose lift without having to reduce engine power substantially, slowing the rate of engine cooling.

Notes and references

External links
Shock Cooling: Myth or Reality? at AvWeb.com
GAMI Injectors at GAMI.com for LOP operation
Image of a graphical bar-graph engine analyzer 
How to Avoid Sudden Cooling of Your Engine at Lycoming

Aircraft engines